Valerie "Val" Cooper is a fictional character appearing in American comic books published by Marvel Comics. The character works for the Office of National Emergency as the liaison for mutant affairs. She once claimed to have been inspired to government service by the interesting cases her brother, an FBI agent, encountered in his work.

Publication history
Valerie Cooper was created by Chris Claremont and John Romita Jr., and first appeared in The Uncanny X-Men #176 (Dec. 1983).

Dr. Valerie Cooper received an entry in The Official Handbook of the Marvel Universe Update '89 #2.

She appeared sporadically as a secondary character, often an antagonist, in various Marvel series through the 1980s, primarily Uncanny X-Men (written by Claremont) and Captain America (written by Mark Gruenwald). When writer Peter David and artist Larry Stroman took over X-Factor in 1991, they added Cooper as a major character, and she was featured in the majority of the series until its cancellation in 1998.

The character reached additional prominence in the mid-2000s, appearing in dozens of issues in 2006 at the height of Marvel's "Decimation" and "Civil War" events. Also in 2006, Peter David returned to write a relaunched X-Factor and eventually featured her in the series during the period 2007-2009. In the 2010s she made few appearances.

Fictional character biography
Dr. Valerie Cooper was originally a special National Security Advisor on national security issues, which include metahuman affairs. Originally, Valerie Cooper took a hard-line concern on the problem of the threat that superhumans and mutants posed to the United States.

Freedom Force
This position changed slightly when Valerie Cooper oversaw Mystique's team, the former Brotherhood of Mutants, which operated as government agents under the new name of Freedom Force. Around this time Cooper was also involved in a project to create government sponsored superheroes which resulted in the creation of the second version of Spider-Woman (Julia Carpenter) as well as three villains that would become her enemies Deathweb. Carpenter would subsequently be assigned by Cooper to join Freedom Force.

Meanwhile, Valerie Cooper and the Commission were directly involved in the events of the government demanding the identity of Captain America under the argument that he was their property. With Steve Rogers giving up the identity of Captain America, Cooper supervised the recruitment of John Walker and Battlestar. The two of them became the new Captain America and the new Bucky, respectively. Valerie Cooper's next duty was to hire Forge, to create a machine to detect mutant powers.

The Freedom Force project was shut down when several members were killed while others were missing after being abandoned in Kuwait. During the Muir Island Saga, Cooper's mind fell under the control of the Shadow King. Valerie was ordered by the Shadow King to shoot Mystique but fought the command and ended up turning the gun on herself.  Val was critically injured, but survived. Mystique, with the aid of Nick Fury and S.H.I.E.L.D. hypnotists, went undercover as Val in an attempt to foil the Shadow King. It wasn't until the defeat of the Shadow King, by the X-Men and X-Factor, that Mystique and Cooper were able to return to their own lives.

X-Factor
After witnessing first-hand the deeds of mutants throughout the years, Valerie Cooper wanted to give the concept of a government sponsored team another shot. She was able to convince several members of the X-Men and their associates to form a new X-Factor team.  This new team, composed of Havok, Polaris, Wolfsbane, Multiple Man, Quicksilver, and Strong Guy replaced Freedom Force, with Val acting as government liaison to the team. Val is assisted by the human employee Baldrick. Soon after Val was once again mentally controlled, this time by the Acolytes. Val was freed from the Acolytes' control, but her relationship with X-Factor was damaged when it was revealed that she knew of Project Wideawake, a new Sentinel project being developed by the U.S. Government. Cooper later decided to hand leadership of the team directly to Forge. With the world getting more dangerous around her and the departure of some of the members, Cooper was forced by the government to allow Mystique and Sabretooth to join. With Forge in command, the team went underground.

Commission on Superhuman Affairs
Cooper returned to the Commission on Superhuman Affairs. In her position, she found herself helping the X-Men out on several occasions. She was later responsible for taking Charles Xavier away to a government facility following the Onslaught incident. Valerie was instrumental in helping the old Thunderbolts defeat Henry Peter Gyrich and negotiated for the team their Presidential Pardon.

O*N*E
Cooper helps establish the Office of National Emergency (or O*N*E), an official government branch dedicated to preparation and defense against superhuman threats; not much later, she becomes its deputy director. The O*N*E, with its first line of defense being the Sentinel Squad O*N*E, becomes responsible for the mutant refugee camp established at the X-Mansion after most of the world's mutants are depowered during the Decimation event. Many mutants join the camp willingly while some are secretly coerced into it.

With the destruction of the X-Mansion and the X-Men's subsequent move to San Francisco, O*N*E no longer watches over the X-Men's day-to-day activities nor does it guard them with Sentinels.

Valerie and Havok enter in a business relationship.

Cooper is revealed to have been involved in an intimate relationship with U.S. Agent whilst working for the Office of National Emergency.

Other versions

Age of Apocalypse
In the Age of Apocalypse reality, Valerie Cooper is a member of an underground resistance group that aids refugees escape from North America to Europe. At one point, she assists a dazed Polaris.

GeNeXt
In Genext comics, set in the relative future, she is the United Nations' liaison to the Xavier School.

Ultimate Marvel
Debuting in Ultimate Fallout #4, Valerie works as a Government official and is preparing for an announcement that will tell the world the truth about where the mutant gene came from.

In other media
Val Cooper will appear in the Disney+ animated series X-Men '97, a revival of the 1990s animated series X-Men.

References

Characters created by Chris Claremont
Characters created by John Romita Jr.
Comics characters introduced in 1983
Marvel Comics female characters
X-Men supporting characters
X-Factor (comics)